Bored with Prozac and the Internet? is an experimental/electronic-based album released in 2013 by TV Mania.

The album was recorded from 1995 to 1996 by TV Mania members Nick Rhodes and Warren Cuccurullo as a side project of their full-time band, Duran Duran. The recordings remained unreleased for some 17 years after having been presumed lost. The chance discovery of the album master tapes by Rhodes led to the set's 2013 release.

References

2013 debut albums
TV Mania albums